Maj Bylock (March 21, 1931 – August 18, 2019) was a Swedish children's writer, translator, and teacher. Her works have been translated into Danish, English, Finnish, Faroese, Dutch, Latvian, Norwegian, Polish, Sami, Turkish, and German. She is the recipient of the Litteris et Artibus medal among other awards.

Biography
Maj Kerstin Andersson was born in Visby, on the Swedish island of Gotland, March 21, 1931. At the age of 12, the family moved to Värmland where she stayed. She completed her studies to be a primary school teacher, and then worked in that profession until 1961.

The first books she wrote were textbooks in history and religion, when she, as a teacher, found that there were no good books for children in these subjects. Over the years, she also wrote books for children and young people as well as adults. Her authorship has a clear historical mark. In 2010, her contribution to improving children's education was the subject of Mary Ingemansson's thesis The Historical Novel and Historical Consciousness in ten- to twelve-year-olds - Maj Bylocks. She is translated into Danish, English, Finnish, Faroese, Dutch, Latvian, Norwegian, Polish, Sami, Turkish, and German. Bylock also contributed a hymn, No. 524, Är dagen fylld av oro och bekymmer, in the Swedish hymn book, music by Anfinn Øien. Her award-winning Solstenen, became a musical. In later years, in addition to her own writing, Bylock recounted a number of notable classics in world literature. The intention was to make them accessible to a greater number of readers and to contribute to a rich, international cultural heritage being passed on. Bylock was awarded the Astrid Lindgren Prize in 1990. She received an honorary doctor from Karlstad University in 2006.

Bylock died in Karlstad, August 18, 2019. She is buried at Nyed's cemetery.

Awards and honors

1967 - Swedish State Cultural Scholarship
1969 - Karlstad City Culture Scholarship to Gustaf Frödings Minne
1969 - 1st prize in Bonniers et al. foreign publisher's competition for the best children's book for Äventyret med grodan
1972 - 2nd prize in the Vecko-Journalen competition The new short story for the novel Honda
1980 - 1st prize in Harrier's novel prize competition for De sjunkna skeppens vik
1981 - Swedish Writers Fund Work Scholarship
1983 - Swedish Writers Fund Work Scholarship, two-year
1983 - 1st prize in Rabén & Sjögren's jubilee prize competition for Solstenen
1986 - Swedish Writer's Fund premium
1987 - 1st prize in Bonnier's jubilee prize for Karusell och kärleksbrev
1988 - 96 - The Swedish Writers' Fund's guaranteed author's allowance
1985 - The Swedish Writers' Association's and the Swedish Journalist's Association's scholarship
1990 - Astrid Lindgren Prize
1999 - County Council of Värmlands Frödings scholarship
2002 - Wettergrens barnbokollon
2005 - Karlstad Municipality's Merit Medal of Merit
2005 - Warm Country Author of the Year
2006 - Honorary Doctor at Karlstad University 
2008 - Värmland Academy Academy Lagerlöv 
2009 - Litteris et Artibus medal
2010 - The Mårbacka Award

Selected works

Textbooks

1961–66 – Morgonsamlingar I–III
1963–82 – Grundskolans religionskunskap årskurserna 1–6
1966–67 – Tapio Finnpojken, Bland borgare och bönder, Bland klosterfolk och riddare
1974–77 – Femettserien Religion, Historia och Naturkunskap
1979 – Kina
1992 – Tomtar, häxor och Mårten Gås

Children's books

1964 – Saga och lek
1969 – Äventyret med grodan
1974 – Frida Tomasine får en syster (part 1/3)
1976 – Fridas första sommarlov (part 2/3)
1976 – Fridas första jobb (part 3/3)
1981 – Jag har ingen trollstav
1982 – Spökskeppet
1984 – Blå fjäril
1986 – Skor med vingar
1987 – Karusell och kärleksbrev (part 1/3)
1988 – Dynamit och hallonbåtar (part 2/3)
1991 – Dödskallar och hjärtesår (part 3/3)
1987 – Micke och hemliga Jansson (part 1/3)
1988 – Micke, Jansson och häxan i gröna huset (part 2/3)
1990 – Micke, Gustav och guldklimpen (part 3/3)
1992 – Hyacinta
1992 – Borgen med trappan som inte fanns
1996 – Tusen guldslantar
1997 – Drakskeppet (part 1/3)
1998 – Det gyllene svärdet (part 2/3)
1998 – Borgen i fjärran (part 3/3)
1997 – Tigern Lisa och monstret (part 1/4)
1997 – Var är monstret? (part 2/4)
1998 – Monster och musöron (part 3/4)
1998 – Monstrets hemlighet (part 4/4)
1999 – Skatter ur Bibeln
2002 – Miss Jamahas hemlighet
1999 – Flykten till järnets land (part 1/7)
2000 – Den svartes hemlighet (part 2/7)
2001 – Spöket på Örneborg (part 3/7)
2002 – Klockan och döden (part 4/7)
2003 – Marie och Mårten i nya världen (part 5/7)
2004 – Blå molnets gåva (part 6/7)
2005 – Celine och drottningen (part 7/7)

Youth books

1973 – Honda
1975 – Helena och filosofen
1983 – Syster Pelle
1983 – Solstenen (part 1/3)
1984 – Månringen (part 2/3)
1985 – Stjärnhavet (part 3/3)
1985 – Trollpaavos klockor
1988 – Silverpil
1989 – Häxprovet (part 1/7)
1990 – Häxans dotter (part 2/7)
1991 – Häxpojken (part 3/7)
1993 – Häxguldet (part 4/7)
1995 – Häxkatten (part 5/7)
1996 – Häxbrygden (part 6/7)
1998 – Häxdoktorn (part 7/7)
1989 – Skrinet på vinden
1994 – De gyllene öarna
2007 – Fågelprinsen (part 1/-)
2008 – Häst med gyllene hovar (part 2/-)
2009 – Dimmornas ö (part 3/-)

Adult books

1980 – De sjunkna skeppens vik
1988 – Här en källa rinner
1989 – Djävulsögat
2001 – Texter ur Bibeln

References

Further reading 
 

1931 births
2019 deaths
20th-century Swedish educators
20th-century Swedish writers
20th-century Swedish women writers
21st-century Swedish writers
21st-century Swedish women writers
Women textbook writers
People from Gotland
Swedish hymnwriters
Swedish non-fiction writers
Swedish women non-fiction writers
Swedish translators
Swedish children's writers
20th-century translators
Litteris et Artibus recipients